Something for Nothing is a humorous story by the science fiction writer Robert Sheckley. It was first published in the journal Galaxy Science Fiction in 1954 and in the collection Citizen in Space in 1955.

Plot 
Waking up one morning, Joe Collins unexpectedly finds in his room a cube with the inscription “Class A Recycler”. After some experimentation, he comes to the conclusion that this is what he had always dreamed of - something that will give him everything he desires. He orders palaces and oil wells, money and cars, herds of pedigree cattle and ballet troupes. One day he asks for immortality. Later he learns that the cube is a device for ordering things, but he still has to pay for the things. However, he still gets something for nothing: namely, immortality, which he gets for free - in order to work off his debt in marble quarries for several thousand years.

Adaptations 
 In 1996, the short film adaptation The Utilizer was shot. The film received an award from the Chicago International Film Festival for special effects, but the general public has never been shown it.
 Russia in 2015 shot its own film adaptation of the same name.

References

Literature 
 Encyclopedia for Children. World Literature. T. 2 / chapters. ed. V. Volodin - M: Avanta +, 2001. - P. 568.

External links
 information in the Science Fiction Lab

1954 books
Books adapted into films
Books by Robert Sheckley
Works originally published in Galaxy Science Fiction